The West Auckland Admirals is an ice hockey team based in Auckland, New Zealand and are members of the New Zealand Ice Hockey League. The Team has always been based out of the Paradice Ice in Avondale, Auckland which in itself has a proud 41-year operating history. In 2011 the rink completed a massive renovation which brought it to international standards and allowed the Admirals team to install their very own changing room (something not that common among NZ ice hockey clubs).

History

The West Auckland Admirals were founded in 2005 and joined the New Zealand Ice Hockey League (NZIHL) for its inaugural season. In their debut season the Admirals finished the regular season in second place and advanced to the finals where they went on to lose to the Southern Stampede. From 2006 to 2009 the Admirals failed to qualify for the finals, finishing in last place in 2006 and 2007 and in fourth in 2008 and 2009 ahead of the newest club in the league, the Dunedin Thunder. In 2010 the Admirals returned to the finals after finishing the regular season in second place. The team however went on to lose to the Botany Swarm in the finals. The following season the Admirals finished the regular season in last place, recording only two wins in their sixteen game season. The team slightly improved in the 2012 season with a fourth place finish, nine points ahead of the last placed Botany Swarm. From 2013 to 2015 the Admirals finished the regular season in last place. In 2016 the Admirals narrowly missed out on making the finals finishing in 3rd place and in 2017 the team made the finals again eventually losing to defending champions SkyCity Stampede. In 2018 the Admirals won the championships against the SkyCity Stampede.

After two disrupted seasons due to the Covid-19 Pandemic, the Admirals returned to the Ice in 2022 where they went onto finish first place in the regular season. This would be the first time the Admirals would host a home finals series in Avondale, where they eventually lost to defending champions the SkyCity Stampede.

Players and personnel

Current roster
2022 Team Roster

Season by season results

Franchise Scoring Leaders

Top 10 - Including Playoffs

Stats are updated after each completed NZIHL regular season

Franchise all-time most appearances
Top 10 - Including Playoffs

Stats are updated after each completed NZIHL regular season

Team Staff History

Team Captaincy History

References

External links
West Auckland Admirals

2005 establishments in New Zealand
Ice hockey clubs established in 2005
Ice hockey teams in New Zealand
New Zealand Ice Hockey League teams
Sport in West Auckland, New Zealand